Iván Molina (born 16 June 1946) is a former professional Colombian tennis player.

Molina and Martina Navratilova teamed to win the 1974 French Open mixed doubles title, beating Rosie Reyes Darmon and Marcello Lara 6–3, 6–3 in the final. Together with Florenţa Mihai, he reached the French Open mixed doubles final in 1977, losing to Mary Carillo and John McEnroe. The left-hander played 46 matches in the Davis Cup for Colombia from 1970 to 1979, winning 15 and losing 14 of his singles matches and winning 7 and losing 10 of his doubles matches. In 1974, he led Colombia to the Davis Cup Americas Inter-Zonal Final. He played 11 Tennis Grand Prix doubles finals (2 win) and 2 singles finals (no wins) and reached his highest singles ranking of 22 in April 1976 on the Grand Prix. He is considered to be the best Colombian tennis player of all time.

Grand Slam finals

Mixed doubles: 2 (1–1)

ATP career finals

Singles: 2 (2 runners-up)

Doubles: 11 (2 titles-9 runner-up)

Performance timelines

Singles

Doubles

Mixed doubles

References

External links
 
 
 

1946 births
Living people
Colombian male tennis players
French Open champions
Sportspeople from Medellín
Grand Slam (tennis) champions in mixed doubles
20th-century Colombian people
21st-century Colombian people